A crop (sometimes also called a croup or a craw, ingluvies, or sublingual pouch) is a thin-walled expanded portion of the alimentary tract used for the storage of food prior to digestion. This anatomical structure is found in a wide variety of animals. It has been found in birds, and in invertebrate animals including gastropods (snails and slugs), earthworms, leeches, and insects.

Insects 

Cropping is used by bees to temporarily store nectar of flowers. When bees "suck" nectar, it is stored in their crops.
Other Hymenoptera also use crops to store liquid food. The crop in eusocial insects, such as ants, has specialized to be distensible, and this specialization enables important communication between colonial insects through trophallaxis. 
The crop can be found in the foregut of insects.

Birds 
In a bird's digestive system, the crop is an expanded, muscular pouch near the gullet or throat.  It is a part of the digestive tract, essentially an enlarged part of the esophagus.  As with most other organisms that have a crop, it is used to temporarily store food.  Not all bird species have one.  In adult doves and pigeons, it can produce crop milk to feed newly hatched birds.

Scavenging birds, such as vultures, will gorge themselves when prey is abundant, causing their crop to bulge. They subsequently sit, sleepy or half torpid, to digest their food.

Most raptors, including hawks, eagles and vultures (as stated above), have a crop; however, owls do not. Similarly, all true quail (Old World quail and New World quail) have a crop, but buttonquail do not. Chickens, turkeys, ducks and geese possess a crop, as do parrots.

Some extinct birds like Enantiornithes did not have crops.

Literary references
In the Sherlock Holmes story "The Adventure of the Blue Carbuncle" (1892), a valuable gem is hidden inside a bird's crop.

"Craw" is an obsolete term for "crop", and this is still seen in the saying "it sticks in my craw" meaning "I can't [metaphorically] swallow it", that is, that a situation or other entity is unacceptable, or at any rate annoying.

See also 
 Esophagus
 Gizzard
 Gular pouch, in bird anatomy, a flap generally used to store fish and other prey while hunting
 Intestines
 Proventriculus
 Stomach

References

External links
 The Alimentary Canal in Birds

Annelid anatomy
Bird anatomy
Gastropod anatomy
Insect anatomy
Dinosaur anatomy